The Soda Lake Geothermal Field is located on the northeast flank of the Soda Lakes volcano, west of the city of Fallon, Nevada in Churchill County.

Exploration of the geothermal site occurred from 1972 to 1986. The Soda Lake I geothermal power plant came online in 1987. The larger Soda Lake II plant started in 1991. Construction of Soda Lake 3 was announced in late 2016. The expansion and upgrades at the combined site are planned to be a total of 37 megawatts.

Road access to the site is via Nevada State Route 723 from US 50.

References

External links
 Videos
 Soda Lake Geothermal Walk Through - Monte Morrison 2012, YouTube video by Alterra Power (geothermal power plant tour)

Geothermal power stations in Nevada
Energy infrastructure completed in 1987
Buildings and structures in Churchill County, Nevada